HMS Llewellyn was a  that served with the Royal Navy. Laid down on 14 December 1912 as HMS Picton, the ship was renamed on 30 September 1913 under an Admiralty order to become one of the first alphabetical class destroyers, being launched on 30 October. On commissioning, the vessel joined the Third Destroyer Flotilla and operated as part of the Harwich Force during the First World War. The destroyer took part in the Battle of Heligoland Bight, as well as undertaking anti-submarine patrols and escort duties. It was during one of these patrols on 4 December 1916 that the vessel unsuccessfully attacked the German submarine . On 17 March 1917, the destroyer was struck in the bow by a torpedo launched by a German torpedo boat while rescuing survivors from the sunk destroyer , but returned to port safely by steaming backwards. With the cessation of hostilities, the ship was placed in reserve. Although subsequently offered for sale to the Finnish Navy, Llewellyn was instead withdrawn from service and sold to be broken up on 18 March 1922.

Design and development

Llewellyn was one of twenty two L- or s built for the Royal Navy. The design followed the preceding  but with improved seakeeping properties and armament, including twice the number of torpedo tubes. The vessel was one of the last pre-war destroyers constructed by William Beardmore and Company for the British Admiralty.

Three funnels were fitted. The ship's complement was 73 officers and ratings.

Armament consisted of three QF  Mk IV guns on the ship's centreline, with one on the forecastle, one aft and one between the funnels. One single  Maxim gun was carried. A single 2-pounder  "pom-pom" anti-aircraft gun was later added. Torpedo armament consisted of two twin mounts for  torpedoes mounted aft. Capacity to lay four Vickers Elia Mk.4 mines was included, but the facility was never used.

Construction and career
Picton was ordered by the British Admiralty under the 1912–1913 Programme as part of a class of destroyers named after characters in Shakespeare's plays and the Waverley novels by Sir Walter Scott. The ship was laid down by William Beardmore and Company at Dalmuir on the River Clyde on 14 December 1912 with the yard number 511. The ship was renamed Llewellyn by Admiralty order on 30 September 1913, joining what was to be the first class named alphabetically, a convention subsequently used for all destroyer classes. The new name commemorated either Llywelyn the Great or Llywelyn ap Gruffudd. The destroyer was constructed at the yard alongside sister ship . Llewellyn was launched on 30 October 1913 and completed on 31 March the following year.

On commissioning, Llewellyn joined the Third Destroyer Flotilla as part of the Harwich Force. At the start of the First World War, the flotilla was tasked with harassing the Imperial German Navy and on 26 August 1914 was ordered to attack German torpedo boats on their patrol as part of a large Royal Navy fleet in what was to be the Battle of Heligoland Bight. The following day, the flotilla joined the battle, led by the scout cruiser , attacking the torpedo boats until the light cruiser  appeared on the scene. In the melee, Llewellyn fired 86 shells.

After that period of intense activity, the destroyer returned to Harwich to defend the Strait of Dover and spent 1915 actively involved in the myriad of tasks that were typical of destroyer service at the time. For example, the destroyer returned to Heligoland Bight to provide escort to British minelayers on 8 January, undertook sweeps for German submarines in the Irish Sea on 29 and 30 January, escorted troop convoys to France on 1 and 2 April and protected minesweepers working on Dogger Bank on 1 and 2 June. On 20 February 1916, the destroyer collided with sister ship  and suffered minor damage. Llewellyn was soon back in service and on 25 March formed part of the escort for the seaplane carrier  which, although unsuccessful in its primary mission of bombing the German Zeppelin sheds in Tønder, did achieve the objective of drawing out the German battlecruisers of the High Seas Fleet. The ship spent much of the rest of the year on anti-submarine patrols and, on 4 December, unsuccessfully attacked the German submarine  with depth charges.

On 28 February 1917, the destroyer was transferred to Dover. On 17 March, the ship formed part of a flotilla including ,  and  patrolling the Dover Barrage. German torpedo boats attacked and sank Paragon. Llewellyn, seeing gun flashes, went to attend and switched on a searchlight to assist in picking up survivors. Attracted by the light, the torpedo boats  and  attacked and launched two torpedoes, one of which struck the destroyer in the bow. By steaming backwards, the ship was able to return to port without suffering casualties. The destroyer was subsequently redeployed to the Methil Convoy Flotilla based on the Firth of Forth. On 22 April 1918, Llewellyn left Selbjørnsfjorden, Norway, escorting a convoy with Lark. The German High Seas Fleet set out to destroy the ships but failed to find them and returned to their base without a shot being fired. This proved one of the last capital ship sorties of the conflict.

After the Armistice of 11 November 1918 that ended the war, the Royal Navy returned to a peacetime level of strength and both the number of ships and the amount of personnel needed to be reduced to save money. Llewellyn was initially placed in reserve at Portsmouth alongside fifty other destroyers. The destroyer was subsequently offered for sale to the Finnish Navy but the purchase was halted by the provisions of the Washington Naval Treaty which denied the sale of superfluous warships by the signatories and instead required the excess destroyers scrapped. In consequence, on 18 March 1922, the vessel was decommissioned, sold to J. Smith of Poole and broken up.

Pennant numbers

References

Citations

Bibliography

 
 
 
 
 
 
 
 
 
 
 
 
 
 
 
 
 
 
 

1913 ships
Laforey-class destroyers (1913)
Ships built on the River Clyde
World War I destroyers of the United Kingdom